Arsenio Valdez (12 December 1942 – 27 March 2014) was a Paraguayan footballer. He played in 14 matches for the Paraguay national football team from 1963 to 1970. He was also part of Paraguay's squad for the 1963 South American Championship.

References

External links
 

1942 births
2014 deaths
Paraguayan footballers
Paraguay international footballers
Association football midfielders
Sportspeople from Asunción
Paraguayan expatriate footballers
Paraguayan expatriate sportspeople in Argentina
Paraguayan expatriate sportspeople in Colombia
Expatriate footballers in Argentina
Expatriate footballers in Colombia